Nheengatu ao Vivo is the seventh live album by Brazilian rock band Titãs, released in August 2015. It was released as CD, DVD and digital download. It was recorded during the band's Nheengatu Tour, promoting the album released in 2014. It includes live renditions of songs from previous albums, as well. In June 2016, Nheengatu ao Vivo won the Prêmio da Música Brasileira, in the "Best Pop/Rock/Reggae/Hip-hop/Funk Group" category. It is the band's last release with vocalist, guitarist and founding member Paulo Miklos, who announced his departure in July 2016.

Tracks

Line up 
Titãs
 Paulo Miklos - vocals and guitar
 Branco Mello - vocals and bass
 Sérgio Britto - vocals, keyboards and bass
 Tony Bellotto - guitar

Touring member
 Mario Fabre - drums

References 

Som Livre live albums
2015 live albums
Titãs live albums
Portuguese-language live albums